KXSB (101.7 FM) is a radio station broadcasting 
Spanish language programs. Licensed to Big Bear Lake, California, United States, it serves San Bernardino County, California. The station is currently owned by Radio Lazer.

External links

FCC History Cards for KXSB
Radio Lazer 101.7 y 100.9 Facebook

XSB
Big Bear Valley
Mass media in San Bernardino County, California
XSB
Radio stations established in 1995
1995 establishments in California